The Tupolev Tu-1 was a prototype Soviet night fighter variant of the Tupolev Tu-2 medium bomber that first flew after the end of World War II. It was cancelled when its experimental Mikulin AM-43V engines reached the end of their service life.

Development
Impressed by the performance of the de Havilland Mosquito the Soviets asked Tupolev to modify a Tu-2 as a high-speed day bomber with a reduced crew as the ANT-63. The second prototype of this project was ordered to be converted in February 1946 for use as a three-seat long-range interceptor capable of carrying an airborne radar set with the internal designation of ANT-63P and the official designation of Tu-1. It was given prototype Mikulin AM-43V engines driving four-bladed propellers, and fitted with new radio equipment. It reverted to the standard Tu-2S undercarriage. Two  Nudelman-Suranov NS-45 guns with 50 rounds each were fitted on the underside of the nose, two  Volkov-Yartsev VYa-23 or Nudelman-Suranov NS-23 cannon were fitted in the wing roots with 130 rounds per gun. The dorsal gunner was given a  UBT machine gun with 200 rounds and the ventral gunner received a UBT with 350 rounds of ammunition.

The Tu-1 first flew on 22 March 1947 and underwent manufacturer's tests until 3 October or 3 November 1947. Sources disagree about the mounting of radar during these tests. Bill Gunston says that a Soviet derivative of the German FuG 220 Lichtenstein SN-2 was tested, however Yefim Gordon believes that no radar was fitted at all and the short service life of the AM-43V prototype engines curtailed the planned tests and development. At any rate, the aircraft was not selected for production because its AM-43V engines were not ready for production.

Specifications

See also

References

 
 

Tu-0001
1940s Soviet fighter aircraft
Mid-wing aircraft
Aircraft first flown in 1947
Twin piston-engined tractor aircraft